Nissim Zvili (born 31 January 1942) is a former Israeli politician.

Biography
Born in Mahdia in Tunisia, Zvili made aliyah at a young age. He graduated from an agricultural high school and later served with the IDF. He took courses in political science at Bar-Ilan University and in public administration at Oxford and Cambridge.

He began his political career during the 1980s and was elected as secretary general of the Moshav movement. As a member of the Labor Party, he was a keen supporter of Shimon Peres as party leader. Among his public appointments were his membership in the executive of the Jewish Agency and of the Histadrut's central committee.

Zvili entered the Knesset as a representative for Labor in the 1992 elections. He was re-elected in the 1996 elections. Shortly after entering the Knesset, in October 1992 he was also elected as secretary general of the party, maintaining the post until January 1998. In 1999 he broke from the Labor parliamentary group to become a founding member of the Center Party. Zvili did not present his candidacy in the 1999 elections.

Between 2002 and 2005 Zvili served as Israel's Ambassador to France, as a political appointment by Minister of Foreign Affairs Shimon Peres.

External links

1942 births
Living people
Israeli people of Tunisian-Jewish descent
Members of the 13th Knesset (1992–1996)
Members of the 14th Knesset (1996–1999)
Ambassadors of Israel to France
Centre Party (Israel) politicians
Israeli Labor Party politicians
Tunisian emigrants to Israel
People from Mahdia